Krystle McLaughlin is a Caribbean-American structural biophysicist. She is an assistant professor of chemistry at Vassar College.

Early life and education 
McLaughlin grew up in Tobago, where she met Joan and Jay Mandle, professors at Colgate University, who encouraged her to apply. She studied physics at Colgate University, graduating in 2006. She was the only woman of colour in her graduating physics class. At Colgate University she was a leader of the Society of Physics Students. She has since returned to Colgate University, to speak at their annual SophoMORE Connections event, introducing undergraduate students to alumni. In 2006 she joined Clara Kielkopf's laboratory at the University of Rochester. She was awarded the University of Rochester William F. Neuman and George Metzger Awards. During her graduate studies she was a guest lecturer at Hampton University. Her thesis used X-ray crystallography to study thermodynamic and structural basis for protein-nucleic acid interactions, and she successfully defended it in 2011.

Research and career 
McLaughlin joined University of North Carolina at Chapel Hill as a postdoctoral researcher, funded by a Seeding Postdoctoral Innovators in Research and Education (SPIRE) fellowship. She characterised proteins responsible for the transfer of antibiotic resistance and virulence in bacterial cells, as well as teaching the biology program. She was appointed a professor of practice at Lehigh University, where she started the PA DNA Day, a now annual celebration of DNA and genetics. She was in Paris during the November 2015 Paris attacks. At Lehigh University she developed innovative ways to teach undergraduates how to interpret crystallography. She uses lysozyme to teach students about molecular modelling and crystallisation. She has campaigned for a Synchrotron light source in South Africa.

She joined Vassar College in 2017 as an assistant professor in chemistry. Here her lab focus on the spread of antibiotic resistance, the gut microbiome and biochemistry of mycobacteriophages.

She takes part in science outreach activities. McLaughlin is the 2018 chair of the American Institute of Physics Liaison Committee on Underrepresented Minorities. She was elected to the American Crystallographic Association communication committees.

References 

American biophysicists
Vassar College faculty
University of Rochester alumni
Colgate University alumni
People from Tobago
Women biophysicists
Living people
Trinidad and Tobago emigrants to the United States
21st-century American scientists
21st-century American women scientists
Scientists from New York (state)
Year of birth missing (living people)
Trinidad and Tobago scientists
American women academics